Albert T. Robles is an American politician and former mayor, councilman, treasurer, and deputy city manager for the City of South Gate, California. In 2005 he was convicted of corruption and sentenced to 10 years in federal prison.

Political career
Robles graduated from the University of California Los Angeles and was a former aide to an African American legislator.

In 1991 Robles became the youngest mayor of South Gate at the age of 26.

In 1992 he was elected to the South Gate City Council by a predominantly Mexican-American electorate.
In 2002 Robles was appointed by the City Council to the Deputy City Manager position.
In 2003 Robles was recalled along with Mayor Xochitl Ruvalcaba, Vice Mayor Raul Moriel, and Councilwoman Maria Benavides in an election that was monitored by Los Angeles County by order of Governor Gray Davis. Robles retained his position as Deputy City Manager.

 In 2005 he was convicted on federal corruption charges then sentenced the following year to 10 years in prison.

Legal controversies

Robles was accused of making threatening statements to State Senator Martha Escutia and Assemblyman Marco Firebaugh. He was tried in 2002 but all charges were dismissed when the jury deadlocked on all counts. His attorney argued that his statements were merely the kind of language typical of South Gate politicians and not literal threats.

Robles was indicted on federal corruption charges in 2004. This stemmed from his award of contracts worth millions to friends and business associates as well as funneling money through the awarded contracts to himself and family members. He was found guilty of 30 counts of bribery, money laundering, and depriving the electorate. He was sentenced to 10 years in federal prison and ordered to pay the city of South Gate $639,000 in restitution.

References

Year of birth missing (living people)
Living people
California city council members
Mayors of places in California
University of California, Los Angeles alumni
People from South Gate, California
California politicians convicted of crimes